A saber-sheath trachea also known as scabbard trachea is a trachea that has an abnormal shape. The posterior area of the trachea increases in diameter while the lateral measurement decreases.

Causes 
It can occur in chronic obstructive pulmonary disease or prolonged bilateral compression on it as in goitre.

References
 Mosby's Medical, Nursing, & Allied Health Dictionary.  Edition 5, 1998 p7B48.

Respiratory diseases